

Deities

Major gods 
 Kök Tengri – God of Sky. Originally the sky itself. Creator of everything. Tengri was the main god of the Turkic pantheon, controlling the celestial sphere.
 Kayra (or Kaira) – Supreme God of universe. He is the Spirit of God and creator god in Turkic mythology. Son of the sky deity (Gok Tengri).
 Erlik or Erklik-Erklikhan – God of the dead and of the underworld. He kept his existence in Tengrism as an evil deity, probably influenced by Zoroastrianism.
 Ulgan (or Ulgen) – God of benevolence. Son of Kaira. He is a Turkic and Mongolian creator-deity.
 Mergen – God of wisdom. Son of Kaira. He is a Turkic deity of abundance and knowledge.
 Kyzaghan – War god of the European Huns. The first Turks did not have a war god. Kyzaghan is the son of Kayra and the brother of Ulgan.
 Umay or Umai – Goddess of fertility. She is the goddess of virginity and as such related to women, mothers and children
 Kuara - God of Thunder and son of Tengri. He is comparable to Thor in Norse Mythology.
 Kubai – Goddess of birth and children. She protects women who give birth. She gives the children souls.
 Koyash or Kuyash – Sun God. Koyash is the son of Gok Tengri "Sky God" and the Earth Goddess.
 Ak Ana – Goddess of creation. Ak Ana, is the primordial creator-goddess of Turkic people. She is also known as the goddess of the water. 
 Ay Ata – Moon God. According to the mythology, he is a moon god and he have been living in sixth floor of the sky with Gun Ana.
 Gun Ana – Sun Goddess. She is the common Turkic solar deity, treated as a goddess in the Kazakh and Kyrgyz mythologies.
 Yel Ana – Goddess of winds. In Hungarian folklore she is referred to as the "queen of wind" too. 
 Yel Ata – God of winds. In Hungarian folklore he is also referred to as the "king of wind".
 Burkut – Eagle God. The eagle god Burkut symbolizes the sun and power.
 Öd Tengri or Öd-Ögöd – God of time. Is seen as the personification of time in Turkic mythology. Usually depicted as a dragon.
 Boz Tengri – God mostly seen as the god of the ground and steppes
 Aisyt – Goddess of beauty. She is also the mother goddess of the Yakut people from Siberia.
 Su Ana – Goddess of water. Su Ana is said to appear as a naked young woman with a fairy-like face.
 Su Ata – God of water. He appears as an old man with a frog-like face, greenish beard, with his body covered in algae and muck. 
 Od Ana – Goddess of fire. Also referred to as goddess of marriage. In Mongolian folklore she is referred to as the "queen of fire".
 Od Ata – God of fire. In Mongolian folklore he is referred to as the Od Khan "king of fire". He is a fire spirit in the shamanistic traditions of Mongolia.
 Yer Tanry – Earth Goddess / God. As a fertility goddess, she was recognized as the giver of crops and abundance.
 Etugen – Earth Goddess. Her name originates from Ötüken, the holy mountain of the earth and fertility goddess of the ancient Turks.
 Hurmuz or Kurmez – God of souls. Also he is a god in Mongolian mythology and shamanism, described as the chief of the 55 gods.
 Jaiyk – God of rivers. He is a god in Turkic pantheon, previously known as Dayık in Altai mythology. He lives at the junction of 17 rivers.
 Alaz – God of fire in Turkic mythology. Also known as Alas-Batyr or sometimes Alaz Khan.
 Baianai – Hunting Goddess. She is also the Yakut goddess of forests and joy.
 Kailyn - Goddess of Kings and Queens. She is in control to find a good king or Queen

Other gods 
 Adaghan – Mountain God. He protects the mountains and the creatures that live there. His name means sacrifice acceptor.
 Akbugha – God of medicine. He is the god of health and healing in ancient Turkic tradition. He has a white serpent.
 Ai Toyon (Sakha: Айыы Тойон, Russian: Айы Тойон) is the Yakut god of light, usually depicted as an eagle perched atop the "world tree".
 Adzis Khanym (Nameless Lady). Goddess of evil.
 Shalyk – Hunting God. He was the Turkic goddess of the hunt, wild animals, wilderness and protector of forests.
 Inehsit – Goddess of childbirth and labour pains. She was the divine helper of women in labour has an obvious origin in the human midwife.
 Qovaq – God of the sky. He brings up a new sun every day; for that reason, he is hunted by Yelbehen to stop her and cause total darkness. 
 Uren – Goddess of the harvest. She presided over grains and the fertility of the earth.
 Zarlık – Goddess of Judgement. She was the goddess of justice, fair judgements and the rights.
 Zada – Wind God. He is the ruler of the winds, and owner of Yada Tashy (Wind Stone).
 Ukulan – Water God. He is the chief of the rivers, springs, streams and fountains.
 Izıh – God of wild animals. He is especially the god of freed animals.
 Chokqu – Goddess of good wishes. She fulfills wishes.
 Talai or Dalai – God of Oceans. He was the personification of the World Ocean, an enormous river encircling the world.
 Kvara or Kuara – God of Thunder from Bulgar origin (comparable to the Norse Thor  )

Creatures

Genuine
 Äbädä – Spirit of forest. It is an innocent spirit in Tatar mythology, that looks like an old woman. Äbädä also is represented in mythologies of Siberian peoples. He protects the birds, trees, and animals of the forest.
 Alara – A famous water fairy (peri) from Lake Baikal in Central Asia who appears in the records and folklore of several Turkic peoples. She appears to those who need her to fix broken hearts and has powers similar to those of Cupid.
 Al Basty – Female daemon spirit. She is an ancient female spirit, the personification of guilt, found in folklore throughout the Caucasus mountains, with origins going as far back as Sumerian mythology.
 Archura – Forest monster. Archura usually appears as a man, but he is able to change his size from that of a blade of grass to a very tall tree. He protects the animals and birds in the forest.
 Arbogha – A creature like bull. Arboghas are half-man, half bull; having the torso of a man extending where the neck of a bull should be. They were said to be wild, savage, and lustful.
 Ardow (su iyesi) – Spirit of water. Ardows are spirits of human souls that died drowning, residing in the element of their own demise. They are responsible for sucking people into swamps and lakes as well as killing the animals standing near the still waters.
 Azmych – Road spirit. He is an evil-spirit that causes disorientation and leads a person aimlessly around and round. The term also refers to lose one's way.
 Basty – Spirit of nightmares. Basty is best known for its shapeshifting abilities and it is an evil spirit or goblin in Turkic folklore which rides on people's chests while they sleep, bringing on bad dreams (or "nightmares").
 Bichura – A household spirit in Tatar / Turkic folklore. Traditionally, every house is said to have a Bichura. It has also been said that Bichura can take on the appearance of cats or dogs. It wears red dresses.
 Chak – A folk devil. He was specifically busy corrupting peasants. While sometimes shown in any rustic setting, he was usually pictured standing on or near a willow tree at the edge of a swamp.
 Chesma iyesi – cat-shaped spirit that lives in wells or fountains and tempts youths to drowning.
 Çor – A jinn-like creature, responsible for mental disorders.
 Chorabash - leader of jinn
 Erbörü – A creature similar to a Werewolf. It is a mythological or folkloric human with the ability to shapeshift into a wolf or a therianthropic hybrid wolf-like creature, either purposely or after being placed under a curse or affliction (e.g. via a bite or scratch from another werewolf).
 Erbüke – A creature like Shahmaran. An Erbüke is often depicted as a wise and benign man with the features of a man above the waist and those of a serpent below the waist. He is held to be king of the snakes. 
 Hortdan or Hortlak – A monster, who goes out from graves. The Hortdans are creatures of Azerbaijani mythology, as a representation of evil spirits, the spirits of the dead.
 Irshi – A fairy-like spirit. She is generally described as a beautiful girl) appearance and having magical powers. Although they are often depicted as young, sometimes winged, tall, radiant, angelic spirits.
 İye – A spirit assigned to a specific element, animal, lineage or place.
 Khyrtyq – A female swamp demon. In Turkic mythology she is known for being malicious and dangerous. She was said to live in thickets near rivers, streams and lakes.
Kormos – ghost of the deceased
Korbolko – a firebird who brought fire to earth and taught the people to burn the fire.
 Mhachkay – Akin of vampire. It is a creature a bit similar to vampire in Turkic (and especially Tatar) folklore. People who were born with two hearts and two souls were believed to be Mhachkay.
 Mu shuvuu – soul of a girl which turned into a bird-like creature.
 Neme – A spiritual being. They are mythical creatures originated in Turkic folklore. Nemes are elves very similar to other ones but they keep watch over forests, mountains, caves and underground.
 Orek – Animated corpse like zombi. In Turkic folklore it is an animated corpse brought back to life by mystical means such as witchcraft. 
 Shurala – Forest daemon. According to legends, Şüräle lives in forests. He has long fingers, a horn on its forehead, and a woolly body. He lures victims to a thicket and tickles them to death.
 Susulu – Mermaid in Turkic mythologies. She is a legendary aquatic creature with the upper body of a female human and the tail of a fish. She is the daughter of the Sea King.
 Ubir – A monster like vampire. It is a mythological or folkloric being in Turkic mythology who subsist by feeding on the life essence (generally in the form of blood) of living creatures, regardless of whether it is undead person or being.
 Uylak – A witch or spirit, that infested with people. An Uylak can turn into any animal or any object. He is capable of shapeshifting into a horse, a moth, or a wolf. He is also resistant to Archura's enchantments.
 Yaryond – A creature like Centaurus. The centaurs are half-man, half horse; having the torso of a man extending where the neck of a horse should be. They were said to be wild, savage, and lustful.
 Yina'mna'ut and Yina'mtilan - the spirits of fogs and mists.
 Yuxa – Queen of serpents. According to popular beliefs, every 100-year-old snake is transformed into Yuxa. In fairy tales, Yuxa is described as a beautiful damsel who would marry men in order to beget offspring.
 Zilant – Serpent-like dragon. Since 1730, it has been the official symbol of Kazan. This winged snake is mentioned in legends about the foundation of Kazan. Zilant should be distinguished from Aq Yılan (White Snake), which is the king of snakes.

Foreign

 Az – Demon of Greed (or Lust), mentioned in Turk Manichaen sources. 
 Cin – Turkish equivalent of the Islamic jinn.
 Dervish – someone, who is devoted to the path of God. He is a source of wisdom and miracles are often attributed to him.
 Dev – An ogre or giant; often with magical abilities and enemy of folk-heroes. Inhabits the underworld. Often confused with Ifrit.
 Karakoncolos – A malevolent creature akin to a bogeyman from Southeast European and indigenous Anatolian folklore. They appear on the first ten days of 'the dreadful cold' (from 25 December to 6 January during which time the sun ceases its seasonal movement), when they stand on murky corners, and ask seemingly ordinary questions to passers-by.
 Hizir – an angel or prophet aiding those in distress.
 Iblis – The devil, or generally a creature, which rebels against God. Identified with Elbis.
 Ifrit – Inhabitant of the underworld. Evil spirit.
 Melek – an angel, genderless spirit in the service of God.
 Peri – An intangible entity. Fairy. Sometimes they are described as agents of evil; later, they are benevolent. They are exquisite, winged, fairy-like creatures ranking between angels and evil spirits. They sometimes visit the realm of mortals.
 Simnu – Uighur equivalent of Manichaean Ahriman or Prince of Darkness.
 Semum – a type of fire or demon envious of mankind, which can possess humans. Also the right hand of the devil.
 Şeytan – evil spirits or demons.
 Zebani – a demonic creature at disposal of Erlik, living in the underworld with the spirits of the damned. According to the Yörüks of Antalya, they cause thunder during their battle against the heavenly forces.

Sources
 Türk Mitolojisi Ansiklopedik Sözlük, Celal Beydili, Yurt Yayınevi 
 Turkish Myths Glossary (Türk Söylence Sözlüğü), Deniz Karakurt (OTRS: CC BY-SA 3.0) 
 Bahaeddin Ögel, Türk Mitolojisi, Türk Tarih Kurumu Publications (Vol-1, Vol-2), Turkey
 Türk Mitoloji Sözlüğü, Pınar Karaca
 Özhan Öztürk. Folklor ve Mitoloji Sözlüğü. Ankara, 2009 Phoenix Yayınları. s. 491 
 Eski Türk Mitolojisi, Jean Russe, and Ryan Reynolds

See also 
Turkic Mythology
Tengrism
Hungarian mythology
Mongol mythology
Turkic peoples

References

External links
 Chosen by the Spirits, Julie Ann Stewart

 
Tengriism